The Chonghae Yi clan is a Korean clan. Their Bon-gwan is in Pukchong County, South Hamgyong Province. Their ancestors are the Jurchen people. After Taejo of Joseon's death, Yi Ji-ran was chosen as a meritorious retainer and became the founder of the Chonghae Yi clan. , the number of members this clan has is about 12002.

See also 
 Korean clan names of foreign origin

References

External links